Ran Blake (born April 20, 1935) is an American pianist, composer, and educator. He is known for his unique style that combines blues, gospel, classical, and film noir influences into an innovative and dark jazz sound. His career spans over 40 recording credits on jazz albums along with more than 40 years of teaching jazz at the New England Conservatory of Music, where he started the Department of Third Stream (now called the Department of Contemporary Improvisation) with Gunther Schuller.

Early life
Blake was born in Springfield, Massachusetts, on April 20, 1935. He grew up in Suffield, Connecticut, and became fascinated by film noir after seeing Robert Siodmak's Spiral Staircase as a twelve-year-old. He began playing piano as a young child, and as a teenager studied with Ray Cassarino. In his teenage years, he developed a love for gospel music and studied the compositions of Béla Bartók and Claude Debussy. After high school, he attended Bard College in New York, graduating in 1960 with a Bachelor of Arts degree in Jazz, a major that had not previously existed at the school. At Bard he met Jeanne Lee, with whom he performed for many years. He also studied with John Lewis, Oscar Peterson, and Gunther Schuller at the School of Jazz in Lenox, Massachusetts.

Performing and studying
Beginning in the late 1950s, Blake was part of a duo with vocalist Jeanne Lee. Together they recorded his first album The Newest Sound Around, which was released on RCA in 1962, and the next year they toured Europe together. The album shows Blake's signature style beginning to develop, as they paid homage to Blake's early influences with a tribute to David Raksin's "Laura" and a reworking of the gospel standard, "The Church on Russell Street". Lee and Blake continued to play together throughout their careers and released another album in 1989 entitled You Stepped out of a Cloud.

Blake met Gunther Schuller in a chance encounter at Atlantic Records in 1959. Recognizing Blake's talent, Schuller asked him to study at the School of Jazz in Lenox, Massachusetts. This was a summer program that existed from 1957 to 1960. It was unique in that it brought together many of the world's foremost jazz musicians of the time, including Dizzy Gillespie and William Russo, to teach students about jazz for an intensive three weeks. Blake attended the School in 1959 and 1960. During his summers in Lenox, Blake began to develop his signature style. Schuller became a great friend and mentor to Blake throughout his career. Schuller organized the recording of The Newest Sound Around for Blake and Lee, and it was he who brought Blake to Atlantic Records, and later to the New England Conservatory.

Blake met jazz pianist, composer, and arranger Mary Lou Williams during a performance at The Composer, a New York nightclub. She later became a mentor and a significant influence on his work. During his time as a student at Bard, Blake often travelled to see Williams perform and to take lessons from her. Later, Williams and Blake worked together while she was a visiting faculty member at the School of Jazz.

In 1966, Blake released his first record as a soloist, Ran Blake Plays Solo Piano, on New York-based label ESP Disk.

Educator
In 1967, Schuller, president of the New England Conservatory, recruited Blake to fill a faculty position as the Conservatory's Community Services Director. In this position, Blake was responsible for putting on concerts in prisons, retirement homes, and community centers. Blake remained in this role until 1973, when he took on the chairmanship of the new Third Stream Department (now Contemporary Improvisation) at the New England Conservatory, an initiative he started with Schuller.

Schuller coined the phrase "Third Stream" in 1957 during a talk at Brandeis University. According to Schuller, Third Stream is "a new genre of music located about halfway between jazz and classical music". This new genre was created, in Schuller's opinion, to combat purists in both the jazz world and the classical world: to play Third Stream music one had to be proficient in both. 

When Schuller met Blake, two years after creating Third Stream, Blake's blend of influences, from free jazz and gospel music to classical composition and film noir soundtracks, appealed to him. When the two of them created the department at the NEC, it was natural that Blake would be the chairman. He remained in that position until 2005. He is a faculty member at the New England Conservatory.

Musicians Don Byron, Matthew Shipp, John Medeski, Frank London, Grayson Hugh, and Yitzhak Yedid have studied with Blake at NEC. He was awarded a Guggenheim Fellowship for composition in 1982 and a MacArthur Genius Grant six years later.

Recording career
Blake has continued recording throughout his career as an educator and has amassed over forty recording credits on jazz albums. His first album with Jeanne Lee won the RCA Album First Prize in Germany, the 1980 Prix Billie Holiday, and is part of the Académie du Jazz. 

After that album, he recorded primarily as a solo pianist, though many of his collaborative albums have received critical acclaim. In 1981, Blake recorded an album of songs by, or associated with, Duke Ellington, entitled Duke Dreams, which was awarded 4.5 stars by AllMusic, and a five-star rating in Down Beat and the All Music Guide to Jazz. 

In 1986, he recorded Short Life of Barbara Monk with saxophonist Ricky Ford, which was selected by the Penguin Guide to Jazz to be part of their Core Collection. He has collaborated with a number of other musicians, including Jaki Byard, Houston Person, Steve Lacy, Clifford Jordan and Christine Correa.

Educational philosophy
Blake's philosophy in teaching differs from that of many music educators, even in the jazz world. He calls his approach "the primacy of the ear". In 1977, he wrote an article for the Music Educator's Journal on having a career as a "Pop/Rock/Jazz instrumentalist". Blake also wrote Third Stream and the Importance of the Ear (1981), which served as a guide to his educational style, as well as an explanation and expansion upon the concept of Third Stream.

In the article, he stressed that "the ear is and should be of primary importance." He discussed the more practical aspects of a career in music and stressed the importance of luck and showmanship over education and background. Blake's focus on improvisation and ear training, coupled with his diverse influences, have made him one of the more innovative music educators of the jazz world. He invites the reader to view Third Stream composition as any composition that bridges two distinct musical cultures, not just classical-jazz fusion. He also stresses the importance of improvisation, and cites the need for improvisational education as one of the reasons he and Schuller started the Third Stream Department at the NEC. Blake argues that music is an aural art, and it must therefore be taught not by being "preoccupied with playing Chopin preludes on the piano or the latest copy of The Real Book (a popular jazz fake book) on the horn or guitar," but by dedicated listening, imitating, and improvising. He calls for students to listen and sing along to melodies on tape until they can reproduce the melody without the tape. It is essential, according to Blake, that a student do this before touching an instrument, as imitating the mechanics of a performance alone does not develop one's ear.

In 2010, Ran Blake published a book with Jason Rogers entitled The Primacy of the Ear. In the 144-page work, Blake details his thinking about the artistic process and distills his approach both to teaching and playing. It explores the relationship between the ear and the mind, musical memory, ear training exercises, and an approach to developing one's personal style.

Discography
An asterisk (*) after the year indicates that it is the year of release.

As leader/co-leader

References

External links
 – official site

Ran Blake at NPR Music
'Ep. 87: Ran Blake, pianist/composer/educator' Interview by Tigran Arakelyan

Third stream pianists
Post-bop pianists
American jazz pianists
American male pianists
Musicians from Springfield, Massachusetts
Bard College alumni
MacArthur Fellows
1935 births
Living people
New England Conservatory faculty
Novus Records artists
Milestone Records artists
Avant-garde jazz pianists
ESP-Disk artists
20th-century American pianists
Jazz musicians from Massachusetts
American male jazz musicians
Ilk Records artists
Improvising Artists Records artists
Music & Arts artists
Sunnyside Records artists
Black Saint/Soul Note artists
Impulse! Records artists
20th-century American male musicians
NoBusiness Records artists